Lofall is an unincorporated community and census-designated place (CDP) located in Kitsap County, Washington, United States. The population was 2,289 at the 2010 census.

A post office called Lofall was established in 1912, and remained in operation until 1934. The community was named after H. Lofall, the original owner of the town site. 

To its east lies Breidablick.

Demographics
In 2010, the CDP had a population of 2,289 inhabitants. 1,202 were male, and 1,087 were female.

Geography
Lofall is located in northern Kitsap County at coordinates 47°48′38″N 122°39′07″W. It sits on the southeast side of Hood Canal, across which is South Point in Jefferson County. Lofall is bordered to the east by Washington State Route 3, which leads northeast  to Port Gamble and south  to Bremerton.

References

Census-designated places in Kitsap County, Washington